Alpurrurulam, from the original Aboriginal name Ilperrelhelame, also known as Lake Nash, is a locality in the Northern Territory of Australia located in the territory's east about  south-east of the territory capital of Darwin and about  east of the municipal seat of Tennant Creek and about  from the border with the state of Queensland. The town is at the end of the Sandover Highway, which floods each year during the wet season and cuts all road access to the community.

History
The waterhole known as Lake Nash to European settlers was used by Aboriginal peoples for millennia, and was called Ilperrelhelame in the Alyawarre language. It has many Dreaming legends attached to it, and the local Alyawarre people lived in a traditional way, hunting and foraging and performing their ceremonies until 1920.

Alpurrurulam grew out of disagreement between the owners of Lake Nash Station and the Aboriginal people living near the Georgina River, many of whom worked at the cattle station. In the early 1980s it was planned to move the community to Bathurst Downs, which was regarded as “poison country” by the local Alyawarre. In 1982 the community requested some land of their own near the station, addressing the then Chief Minister of the Northern Territory Government. After a legal battle,  was excised from the pastoral lease of the   Lake Nash Station and given back in 1983, forming what is now Alpurrurulam. The Alpurrurulam Land Aboriginal Corporation (ALAC), a board of community elders, was established as landowner.

The Alpurrurulam Community Government Council (CGC) was the local government authority until 1 July 2008, when there was an amalgamation of councils into a new shire framework and the town was absorbed into the Barkly Shire.

Governance and population
Alpurrurulam is located within the federal division of Lingiari, the territory electoral division of Barkly and the local government area of the Barkly Region, in the ward of Alpurrurulam.

The town is usually called Alpurrurulam or Lake Nash. The town is mostly referred to as Lake Nash colloquially, and for mail delivery (via Mount Isa), and Alpurrurulam for all official matters, such as a census.

The 2016 Australian census which was conducted in August 2016 reports that Alpurrurulam had a population of 420 people of whom 387 (92.1%) identified as being Aboriginal and/or Torres Strait Islander people.

The people of Alpurrurulam have close historical ties with the people of Ampilatwatja, in Utopia.

Facilities

Services include the Barkly Regional Council Alpurrurulam Service Centre, aged care facilities, night patrol, sport and recreation, Centrelink, a post office, the Warte Alparayetye community-owned store, Alpurrurulam Community School (to Year 9), and the Rainbow Gateway, a new community development program. It also has a small Australian rules football club.

There is an airstrip, with planes departing for Mt Isa for health appointments once a week, and a special mail plane on Fridays.

A wind farm and a solar farm with hybrid solar-diesel power system, were installed in 2011–2012.

References

Aboriginal communities in the Northern Territory